The 1980 Giro d'Italia was the 63rd running of the Giro. It started in Genoa, on 15 May, with a  prologue and concluded in Milan, on 8 June, with a  mass-start stage. A total of 130 riders from thirteen teams entered the 22-stage race, that was won by Frenchman Bernard Hinault of the Renault–Gitane–Campagnolo team. The second and third places were taken by Italians Wladimiro Panizza and Giovanni Battaglin, respectively.

Amongst the other classifications that the race awarded, Gis Gelati's Giuseppe Saronni won the points classification, Claudio Bortolotto of Mobilifico San Giacomo–Benotto won the mountains classification, and Bianchi–Piaggio's Tommy Prim completed the Giro as the best rider aged 24 or under in the general classification, finishing fourth overall. Bianchi–Piaggio finishing as the winners of the team classification, ranking each of the twenty teams contesting the race by lowest cumulative time.

Teams

A total of thirteen teams were invited to participate in the 1980 Giro d'Italia. Each team sent a squad of ten riders, which meant that the race started with a peloton of 130 cyclists. From the riders that began this edition, 89 made it to the finish in Milan.

The teams entering the race were:

Route and stages

The route for the 1980 edition of the Giro d'Italia was revealed to the public by head organizer Vincenzo Torriani on 31 January 1980. Four of these ten stages had summit finishes: stage 8, to Fiuggi; stage 11, to Campotenese; stage 14, to Roccaraso; and stage 18, to Zoldo Alto. In the case the Stelvio was not passable by bike, the nineteenth and twentieth stages had a back-up plan where that took an alternate route through the Pordoi Pass in stage nineteen and would be the new Cima Coppi. The organizers chose to include two rest days. When compared to the previous year's race, the race was  longer and contained two less time trials. In addition, this race contained three more stages.

Classification leadership

Three different jerseys were worn during the 1980 Giro d'Italia. The leader of the general classification – calculated by adding the stage finish times of each rider, and allowing time bonuses for the first three finishers on mass-start stages – wore a pink jersey. This classification is the most important of the race, and its winner is considered as the winner of the Giro.

For the points classification, which awarded a purple (or cyclamen) jersey to its leader, cyclists were given points for finishing a stage in the top 15; additional points could also be won in intermediate sprints. The green jersey was awarded to the mountains classification leader. In this ranking, points were won by reaching the summit of a climb ahead of other cyclists. Each climb was ranked as either first, second or third category, with more points available for higher category climbs. The Cima Coppi, the race's highest point of elevation, awarded more points than the other first category climbs. The Cima Coppi for this Giro was the Stelvio Pass. The first rider to cross the Stelvio was French rider Jean-René Bernaudeau. The white jersey was worn by the leader of young rider classification, a ranking decided the same way as the general classification, but considering only riders aged 24 and younger.

Although no jersey was awarded, there was also one classification for the teams, in which the stage finish times of the best three cyclists per team were added; the leading team was the one with the lowest total time.

The rows in the following table correspond to the jerseys awarded after that stage was run.

Final standings

General classification

Points classification

Mountains classification

Young rider classification

Combination classification

Team classification

References

Citations

 
Giro d'Italia by year
Giro d'Italia
Giro d'Italia
Giro d'Italia
Giro d'Italia
1980 Super Prestige Pernod